This is a list of films produced by the Telugu language film industry based in Hyderabad in the year 1990.

1990

Dubbed films

Highest Grossing

References 

1990
Telugu
 Telugu films
1990 in Indian cinema